Joseph Christophe, the brother of Claude Christophe, was born at Verdun in 1662. In 1696 he painted as a "mai" for Notre-Dame the Miracle of the Loaves and Fishes. He was received into the Academy in 1702, and in 1724 became painter to the Archduke Leopold, for whom he executed many portraits. At Versailles there is by him The Baptism of Dauphin, son of Louis XIV. He died in Paris in 1748.

References
 

1662 births
1748 deaths
People from Verdun
17th-century French painters
French male painters
18th-century French painters
18th-century French male artists